The Mangala Lakshadweep Superfast Express is a Superfast train in India that runs between  in Delhi and  in Kochi, Kerala via the Konkan Railway route. It is operated by Southern Railway with 12617 / 12618 train numbers. In 1973, the earlier version of this train (Jayanti Janata Express (131/32)) was the first direct train to Kerala and Coastal Karnataka from the national capital. In its renewed form as Mangala Lakshadweep Express, it became the 1st daily train connecting North,Central Kerala and New Delhi after Kerala Express (1977). It is also regarded as the 1st daily direct access train to the national capital for the Malabar (North Kerala) districts, Coastal Karnataka districts and Lakshadweep.It is the only train which connects Nashik,Manmad to Kerala apart from Coimbatore Jabalpur Express.

The train's name and history
The train was started on 26 January 1973 when T. A. Pai was the Minister of Railways. It was started as the first direct train from New Delhi to Kerala and Karnataka. Till then the people of Kerala and Karnataka relied on Grand Trunk Express that operated between Chennai and New Delhi for travel to the capital.

The train then was composed of only second class as Janata Express trains introduced then envisaged a classless society and upheld principles of socialism. It was called Jayanti Janata Express since 1972–73 was the Silver Jubilee (Rajatha Jayanthi) of Indian Independence. The train number was 2625A/2626A as was christined Link Mangala Exp (MAQ–PGT–MAQ). Since the Konkan Railway was not yet constructed, the train was earlier running between Mangalore and Delhi in a roundabout route through , .

Later in 1993, the slip service got discontinued & this train was made independent & officially renamed as 2617/18 Mangala Express. Since the train was running till Mangalore, the name Mangala was derived from Mangaladevi, the most important deity of Mangalore city. In 1998–99 when Konkan Railway was opened this train got rerouted to Mangaluru via Konkan. Later, Ram Vilas Paswan extended this train to Ernakulam Junction in Kochi for the purpose of providing rail connection to Lakshadweep passengers who arrive at Kochi via ship. The booking facilities were opened at Kavaratti. Subsequently, the train got renamed as Mangala Lakshadweep Express.

Traction
As the route is completely electrified a Royapuram or an Erode-based WAP-7 hauls the train through out its entire journey.

Timings before Konkan Railway 
This train left Mangalore at 16:10 hrs to reach  at 20:25 hrs on the 3rd day. Return this train left Hazrat Nizamuddin at 08:50 hrs to reach Mangaluru at 13:05 hrs on the 3rd day.

Current timings
This train leaves  at 13:30 hrs to reach  at 13:30 hrs on the 3rd day. Return this train leaves Hazrat Nizamuddin at 05:40 to reach Ernakulam Junction at 07:10 on the 3rd day. The monsoon timings of the train are different and takes 2 hrs 15 minutes more to complete the journey.

Accidents
On 22 February 2013, 4 coaches of the 12618 Hazrat Nizamuddin–Ernakulam Mangala Lakshadweep Express derailed near Nashik, leaving 20 persons injured. On 15 November 2013, 10 coaches including all the AC coaches of the 12618 Hazrat Nizamuddin–Ernakulam Mangala Lakshadweep Express derailed near Nashik again at 6:40 a.m., leaving 5 persons dead and 50 injured. In both cases, track rupture is suggested as cause of the accident.
On 1 March 2015 3 coaches of 12617 ( S9, S10 & Pantry car) Hazrat Nizamuddin–Ernakulam derailed near Pen, Raigad district with no casualties reported since the train was just outbound on the station and picking up speed.

Route & Halts 

 Mathura
 Agra Cantt.
 Morena
 
 
 
 
 
  
  
 Nasik Road railway station
 
 
 
 
  
 
 
 
 
 
 Kozhikode Main

Rake composition
The Train has been upgraded to LHB coach starting from 12 December from Ernakulam and 15 December from Nizamuddin. The final 6th rake will be LHBfied by 15 February Ex Ernakulam & by 18 February Ex Nizamuddin.

 2 AC II Tier
 6 AC III Tier
 1 AC III Tier Economy
 8 Sleeper coaches
 2 General
 2 Generator vans

References

External links 
 
 Konkan Railway
 Mangala Express route map

Transport in Kochi
Transport in Delhi
Named passenger trains of India
Express trains in India
Rail transport in Kerala
Rail transport in Uttar Pradesh
Rail transport in Madhya Pradesh
Rail transport in Karnataka
Rail transport in Goa
Rail transport in Maharashtra
Rail transport in Haryana
Rail transport in Delhi
Railway services introduced in 1998